Ryan Arnold Futagaki (born January 17, 1980) is a former American soccer player who last played as a midfielder for the Chicago Fire in Major League Soccer.

Club career
Futagaki was picked by the Chicago Fire in the 2003 MLS SuperDraft from the University of California Los Angeles. In 2003, he played six matches and had one assist. In January, 2004, he was released by the Chicago Fire and starting playing indoor soccer. He later signed with the Chicago Storm. He currently plays beach soccer.

International career
Futagaki was part of the United States U20 team that participated in the 1999 FIFA World Youth Championship, scoring one goal against his ancestral Japan in a 1–3 defeat.

He is currently part of the United States national beach soccer team.

References

External links
 

1980 births
Living people
American beach soccer players
American soccer players
American sportspeople of Japanese descent
Association football midfielders
Chicago Fire FC draft picks
Chicago Fire FC players
Chicago Storm players
Major League Soccer players
People from Fountain Valley, California
Soccer players from California
UCLA Bruins men's soccer players
United States men's under-20 international soccer players
United States men's under-23 international soccer players